Secret Paths is a studio album by Dave Cousins.

Track listing

All songs written by Dave Cousins except where noted.

"Song of a Sad Little Girl"
"Plainsong"
"The Shepherd's Song"
"I Turned My face into the Wind"
"Ringing Down the Years"
"Josephine (For Better or for Worse)"
"Canada"
"How I Need You Now"
"I'll Show You Where to Sleep"
"Beat the Retreat"
"Falling in Love Again" (Frederick Hollander, Sammy Lerner)

Personnel

Dave Cousins – vocals, acoustic guitar, banjo, dulcimer
Melvin Duffy – steel guitar

Recording

Chris Tsangarides – producer

Release history

References

External links
Secret Paths on Strawbsweb

2008 albums
Dave Cousins albums
Albums produced by Chris Tsangarides